Venmankondan is a village in the Udayarpalayam taluk of Ariyalur district, Tamil Nadu, India.

Demographics 

As per the 2001 census, Venmankondan (East) had a total population of 2932 with 1442 males and 1490 females.

References 

Villages in Ariyalur district